Literal: Latin American Voices is a quarterly cultural magazine focusing on art, architecture, literature, politics, culture, writers, intellectualism and current world events. It publishes most of its articles in both English and Spanish.  It distributes nationwide in Mexico, the United States and Canada.

History
Literal was founded in 2004 by Rose Mary Salum. Its purpose is to provide a medium for the critique and diffusion of the Latin American literature and art, recognizing its potential strength as a point of departure for understanding.

Reception and awards
Literal has won 2 Council of Editors of Learned Journals (CELJ) Awards and four Lone Star Awards.

Chief editors
Rose Mary Salum.
David Medina Portillo

References

External links

Magazines established in 2004
Bilingual magazines
Quarterly magazines published in the United States
Spanish-language magazines
Visual arts magazines published in the United States